The Alfaguara Novel Prize is a Spanish-language literary award. The award is one of the most prestigious in the Spanish language. It is sponsored by Alfaguara, a publisher owned by Penguin Random House.

The prize was created in 1965 by Alfaguara and continued until 1972. In 1980 Alfaguara was purchased by Grupo Santillana. In 1998 the award was reconvened.

Winners

References

External links 
Alfaguara Prize home page 

Spanish-language literary awards
International literary awards
Spanish literary awards
Awards established in 1997
Fiction awards
1997 establishments in Spain
Awards established in 1965
1965 establishments in Spain
Awards disestablished in 1972
1972 disestablishments in Spain